Badasht may refer to:

 Badasht, Qazvin
 Badasht, Semnan
 Conference of Badasht, a meeting of leading Bábís in 1848